Wilma Samt (28 May 1926 – 15 February 2016) was an Austrian chess player who three times won the Austrian Women's Chess Championship (1966, 1970, 1973).

Biography
From the mid-1960s to the begin 1980s Wilma Samt was one of the leading Austrian women's chess players. In Austrian Women's Chess Championship she won six medals: three gold (1966, 1970, 1973) and three bronze (1975, 1978, 1980). In 1966, in Arenys de Mar Wilma Samt participated in FIDE Women's World Chess Championship West European Zonal Tournament.

Wilma Samt played for Austria in the Women's Chess Olympiads:
 In 1963, at second board in the 2nd Chess Olympiad (women) in Split (+1, =3, -5),
 In 1969, at first reserve board in the 4th Chess Olympiad (women) in Lublin (+0, =2, -1),
 In 1972, at first reserve board in the 5th Chess Olympiad (women) in Skopje (+2, =2, -3),
 In 1974, at second board in the 6th Chess Olympiad (women) in Medellín (+3, =3, -2),
 In 1976, at first reserve board in the 7th Chess Olympiad (women) in Haifa (+3, =2, -1),
 In 1980, at third board in the 9th Chess Olympiad (women) in Valletta (+4, =4, -3).

References

External links

Wilma Samt chess games at 365Chess.com

1926 births
2016 deaths
Austrian female chess players
Chess Olympiad competitors
20th-century chess players